Aurel Plasari (born 16 September 1955) is an Albanian, lecturer, scholar, writer, translator and professor.

Early life and education
Plasari was born in Tirana, where he completed all levels of his education. At the age of seventeen, while still in high school, Plasari began to publish translations from world literature. ("Nëntori" magazine, No. 3 (March) 1973)

Career
After graduating from secondary school, he fulfilled compulsory military service and, as for several years his right to pursue higher education was denied for "biographical" reasons, he started work at the most basic level of the press, as a copy-editor in the typography for "Mihal Duri".

From 1982 he worked as literary editor at the magazine "Nëntori", an organ of the Writers and Artists' Union of Albania. After graduation in 1989 he worked as an editor of translated literature, and later in 1990 as secretary of the editorial board, at the same magazine.

Beginning in 1990 he was became a part-time lecturer at the University of Tirana's Faculty of History and Philology. In 1991 he completed a postgraduate specialization at "Alcalá" University in Madrid, Spain, and in 1992 he became a full-time lecturer at the Faculty of History and Philology (UT), where he also held the position of vice dean. In 1994 he obtained a doctoral degree in Comparative Literature.

Plasari was a lecturer and doctoral fellow for university subjects such as "History of Aesthetics" and "Principles of Aesthetics", as well as for special courses "Introduction to Narratology", "Theory of Reception", etc. In 1995 he became an "Associate Professor", and from 1995 to 1996 was a guest lecturer at Inalco (Institut des Langues et Civilisations Orientales), Paris. Returning to Albania, he continued to work at the Faculty of History and Philology (UT) until 1998, when he became director of the National Library of Albania, a post he still held in 2014. Since 2010 he has held the title of "Professor". In the Master's Course of Library Science's Second Level, organized in the Albanian education system, he has developed the subject "Introduction to Albanology".

From 1990 until 2014 he engaged in national and international scientific-academic activities, lecturing and attending conferences in various countries.

Plasari headed the new edition of the cultural magazine "Hylli i Dritës" in 1993–1997 (from the reopening until it was closed again), and wrote in the free Albanian press, including the newspaper "Rilindja Demokratike" from its first issue, writing in various fields of culture, but also on policy. Beginning in 1990, some editions of Fishta, Merxhani, Harapi, and Beduli have been prepared by him; he also directed the series "Intelligenda" (Publishing House "55"), with various Albano-Balkanological's contributors, including Jorga, Jirecek, Gelcich, Suliotti, Londres, Konica, Nadin, and Xhufi.

In 2012 he was member of Interministerial Committee of Celebration of Proclamation of Independence's 100th Anniversary.

Books and works

In Albanian 

Don Kishoti zbret në Shqipëri, Tiranë 1990;

Vija e Teodosit rishfaqet, Tiranë 1993; T. 1995;

Letërsia dhe muret, Tiranë 1993;

Anton Harapi Redimensus, Tiranë 1994;

Kuteli midis të gjallëve e të vdekurve, Tiranë 1995;

Fishta i dashuruari, Tiranë 1996;

Plani i fshehtë për një Internacionale të re, Tiranë 1996;

Përballë një kulture të vdekjes, Tiranë 1997;

Biopolitika: a ekziston në Shqipëri? Tiranë 1999;

Fenomeni Voskopojë, Tiranë 2000;

Dhjetë ditë që nuk tronditën botën (arlekinadë), Tiranë 2001;

Lufta e Trojës vazhdon, Tiranë 2002;

Rrëmbimi i Europës, Tiranë 2005;

Alfabete në Bibliotekë, Tiranë 2008;

Skënderbeu: një histori politike, Tiranë 2010;

Arbëria në hartat e vjetra të Bibliotekës Kombëtare (Shekujt XVI-XVIII). Tiranë 2013 (nën kujdesjen e)

Shqipëria dhe shqiptarët ne 'Europën' e Piut II, Tiranë 2014;

Arbni historik, gjeografik, kishtar dhe politik, Tiranë 2020, Tiranë 2021;

Barleti i hershmë sipas një dorëshkrimi të panjohur (me Lucia Nacin), Tiranë 2022 (Akademia e Studimeve Albanologjike).

Published abroad 

Saint Jerôme – fils d'Illyrie, Tirana 1990

La linea di Teodosio torna a dividere, Bari 1998; Bari 2000

The Line of Theodosius reappears, New York 2001

Il ratto dell'Europa, Bari 2009

Translations from world literature 

L. Hughes: Lumi i vrerit, T. 1976;

J. L. Caragiale: Një letër e humbur, T. 1977;

H. Smirnenski: Të bëhet dritë, T. 1977.

Këngë të popujve, T. 1978 (bashkëpërkthyes);

A. Jozsef: Shoku pyll, buçit, T. 1979;

Muzat në vitin e luftës, T. 1980 (bashkëpërkthyes);

Poetë francezë, T. 1980 (bashkëpërkthyes);

A. Mizkiewicz: Vjersha dhe poema, T. 1980 (bashkëpërkthyes);

F. García Lorca: Jerma, T. 1982;

F. García Lorca: Dasmë gjaku, T. 1985;

Tregime e novela të shek.XX, T.1983 (bashkëpërkthyes);

Antologji e poezisë së re greke, T. 1986 (bashkëpërkthyes);

G. García Márquez: Gjethurinat, T. 1986, Prishtinë 1988;

Kolonelit s’ka kush t’i shkruajë, T. 1986, Prishtinë 1988;

Një histori me paskuinë, T. 1986, Prishtinë 1988;

Kronikë e një vdekjeje të paralajmëruar, T. 1986, Prishtinë 1988; T. 1999;

Esé dhe shkrime të tjera kritike, T. 1988 (bashkëpërkthyes);

J. Cortázar: Autostrada e Jugut, T. 1988, Prishtinë1989;

F. Dostoiewski: Net të bardha, T. 1990, T. 1995; T. 1999, T. 2022;

Poetë spanjollë të shekullit XX, T. 1991;

M. Sorescu: Një flatër dhe një këmbë, T. 1993;

J. Cortázar: Armët e fshehta, T. 1999;

O. Fallaci: Mllefi dhe krenaria, T. 2001;

A . Ahmatova: Përzitje, T. 2003;

A . Ahmatova: Poezi, T. 2009;

I. Montanelli: Shqipëria një dhe njëmijë, T. 2003; T. 2005;

C. Malaparte: Teknika e grushtit të shtetit, T. 2006;

A. Ahmatova: Ballo me maska në park, T. 2019;

J. Cortázar: Qielli i rremë, Tregime, T. 2021.

Awards, orders and honors 

2021 2014 Urdhri "Gjergj Kastrioti Sknderbeu". Presidenti i Republikës së Shqipërisë

2018 Çmimi Shkencor Ndërkombëtar për studimet më të suksesshme për Gjergj Kastriotin – Skënderbeun në Vitin Mbarëkombëtar kushtuar figurës dhe epokës së tij. Akademia e Shkencave e Shqipërisë.

2016 Çmimi “KULT”, për librin studimor "Shqipëria dhe shqiptarët ne 'Europën' e Piut II. Akademia "Kult".

2014 Urdhri "Nderi i Kombit". Presidenti i Republikës së Shqipërisë

2012 Mirënjohje e Kuvendit të Shqipërisë, në 100-Vjetorin e Shpalljes së Pavarësisë së Shqipërisë.

2010 Çmimi “KULT”, për përkthimin “Poezi” nga Anna Ahmatova, Akademia “Kult”.

2009 Dëshmi e Mirënjohjes. Biblioteka Kombëtare dhe Universitare e Kosovës.

2008 "Ordine al Merito della Reppublica Italiana”. Presidenti i Republikës Italiane.

2005 Çmimi “Best Practice”, edicioni I, Për drejtimin e Bibliotekës Kombëtare. Junior Chamber Italiana / Junior Chamber International.

2003 Çmimi “Serembe”. Për librin “Lufta e Trojës vazhdon”. Fondacioni “Serembe”.

2000 “Penda e Argjendtë”. Për përkthimin e librit “Armët e fshehta”, Julio Cortazar; Ministria e Kulturës.

1993 Çmimi “Përkthimi më i Mirë Letrar”. Për librin “Një flatër dhe një këmbë”, Marin Sorescu. Ministria e Kulturës.

1989 Urdhri “Naim Frashëri” “Për kontribut të veçantë e me nivel të lartë artistik në fushën e përkthimeve letrare”. Presidiumi i Kuvendit Popullor.

References 

Zëri “Aurel Plasari” në “Leksikon i shkrimtarëve shqiptarë 1501- 1590), Prishtinë 1994.

Zëri “Aurel Plasari” në: Gjergj ZHEJI & Natasha XHAFKA, Fjalor enciklopedik letrar, Tiranë 2001;

Zëri “Aurel Plasari" në: Robert ELSIE, Historical Dictionary of Albania, New Edition, The Scarecrow Pres, Inc., Lanham, Maryland & Oxford 2004;

Zëri “Aurel Plasari”, në “Gazetarë dhe publicistë shqiptarë - Fjalor enciklopedik”, Tiranë 2005.

Zëri “Aurel Plasari”, në “Fjalori Enciklopedik shqiptar”, vëll. III, Tiranë 2009.

References

External links
  Albanian National Library
 Repubblica Italiana, il Quirinale
 Aurel Plasari

1955 births
Living people
Albanian male writers
English–Albanian translators
Aromanian writers
Albanian people of Aromanian descent
Writers from Tirana
Albanian atheists
Albanian essayists
Albanian non-fiction writers
20th-century Albanian historians
21st-century Albanian historians
Translators from Italian
Translators from French
Translators from Russian
Translators from Spanish
Translators from Greek
Translators from Romanian
Albanian translators
Aromanian translators
20th-century translators
21st-century translators
Academic staff of the University of Tirana
20th-century essayists
21st-century essayists
20th-century male writers
21st-century male writers
Male non-fiction writers